Joseph L. Garvens (April 20, 1886 - July 1974) was a member of the Wisconsin State Assembly.

Garvens was born on April 20, 1886 in Elm Grove, Wisconsin. He attended a parochial school.

Career
Garvens was a member of the Assembly during the 1933, 1935 and 1937 sessions. He was a Democrat.

References

People from Elm Grove, Wisconsin
Democratic Party members of the Wisconsin State Assembly
Marquette University alumni
1886 births
1974 deaths
20th-century American politicians